Paul Kelly - Stories of Me is a 2012 Australian documentary directed by Ian Darling and produced by Shark Island Productions.

The film sold out within 10 hours at the 2012 Melbourne International Film Festival and before its official theatrical release on 25 Oct 2012, the film went on a sold out National Tour as special event releases with Paul Kelly and director Ian Darling appearing on stage after the screening.

It was broadcast on the ABC on 27 October 2012.

Subject
With a career spanning more than thirty years, this feature-length documentary explores Kelly's life from his childhood in Adelaide as the sixth of nine children and grandson of two famous opera singers, through to his reputation as one of Australia's best singer-songwriters. The relationship of Kelly's art to his life and personal journey are revealed as are the many hurdles he faced along the way. The interview subjects include various members of Kelly's family, many of his fellow musicians and friends including novelists Richard Flanagan and Fiona McGregor, film director Rachel Perkins and musicians Megan Washington and Archie Roach.

Social impact

As part of the film's social impact and educational outreach program Shark Island Productions and The Caledonia Foundation launched Paul Kelly & The Portraits at the National Portrait Gallery by The Hon Tony Burke MP and Paul Kelly - Portrait of an Artist Schools' Education and Curriculum program by Peter Garrett and developed with the English Teachers Association NSW. The report Music to Our Ears with the Music Council of Australia was commissioned to increase parental engagement to advance music education in schools.

Paul Kelly - The Essays is a companion paperback book and e-book to the film tracking Kelly's life from aspiring cricketer as a young boy through to his status as one of Australia's best musicians.

Awards and nominations
Won ATOM AWARD (2013) Best Educational/Training Resource (Primary/Secondary)
Won ATOM AWARD (2013) Best Documentary Arts
Finalist ATOM AWARD (2013) Best Documentary General
Finalist ATOM AWARD (2013) Best Documentary Biography 
Won Australian Screen Sound Guild Award (2013) Best Sound in a Documentary 
Won FCCA Award (2012) Best Documentary
 Nominated AACTA Award (2013) Best Sound in a Documentary Paul Charlier
 Nominated ADG Award (2013) Best Documentary Feature Ian Darling
 Won ASE Award (2013) Best Documentary Editing Sally Fryer
Official Selection at the Melbourne International Film Festival 2012
Official Selection at the Canberra International Film Festival 2012

Production
Cast

Paul Kelly (musician)

Production
Ian Darling as Director
Sally Fryer ASE as Editor
Susan Mackinnon as Producer
Mary Macrae as Producer
Toby Creswell as Executive Producer
David Leser as Executive Producer
Simon Smith as Director of Photography
Benjamin Cunningham as Cinematographer
Paul Charlier as Sound Designer and Music Mixer

Music

Paul Kelly (musician)

References

External links

2012 films
Australian documentary films
Documentary films about rock music and musicians
2010s English-language films